Henry George Taylor (1892–1960) was an English footballer.

Career
Taylor played for local Staffordshire teams Chell Heath and Fegg Hayes. He then had spells with Newcastle United and Fulham before joining Stoke. He signed with Huddersfield Town in 1911 and played fifteen league games, scoring five goals. He joined Port Vale for £30 in May 1912, but was reported to have been sold on to Manchester City for £300 the following month without having taken to the field for the "Valiants".

Career statistics
Source:

References

1890s births
1960 deaths
English footballers
Footballers from Stoke-on-Trent
Association football forwards
Newcastle United F.C. players
Fulham F.C. players
Stoke City F.C. players
Huddersfield Town A.F.C. players
Port Vale F.C. players
Manchester City F.C. players
English Football League players